Richard Allen Rellford (born February 16, 1964) is a retired American professional basketball player. Born in Riviera Beach, Florida, he was a 6' 6" (1.98 m) 230 lb (104 kg) power forward. He played four games in the NBA, and three seasons in the Israeli Basketball Premier League.

College career
Rellford played college basketball at the University of Michigan, with the Michigan Wolverines.

Professional career
Rellford was selected with the second pick of the fifth round in the 1986 NBA Draft by the Indiana Pacers. He played for the San Antonio Spurs for 4 games in 1987–88, averaging 4.0 points and 1.8 rebounds per contest.

He played three seasons in the Israeli Basketball Premier League. In 1989–90 he averaged 26.6 points per game in the league, and averaged 9.2 rebounds per game.

References

External links
NBA stats @ basketballreference.com
Richard Rellford historic info page @ NBA.com

1964 births
Living people
AEK B.C. players
AEL Limassol B.C. players
American expatriate basketball people in Argentina
American expatriate basketball people in Cyprus
American expatriate basketball people in Greece
American expatriate basketball people in Israel
American expatriate basketball people in Spain
American men's basketball players
Basketball players from Florida
CB Canarias players
CB Girona players
Dafnis B.C. players
Hapoel Holon players
Indiana Pacers draft picks
Irakleio B.C. players
Liga ACB players
Maccabi Rishon LeZion basketball players
McDonald's High School All-Americans
Michigan Wolverines men's basketball players
Pagrati B.C. players
Parade High School All-Americans (boys' basketball)
Peñarol de Mar del Plata basketball players
Power forwards (basketball)
Quad City Thunder players
Rapid City Thrillers players
San Antonio Spurs players
Sioux Falls Skyforce (CBA) players
Small forwards
United States Basketball League players
Wyoming Wildcatters players